Roi Huber (born February 10, 1997) is an Israeli professional basketball player for Hapoel Galil Elyon of the Israeli Basketball Premier League.

Early life
Huber was born in Kadima, Israel. He played for Hapoel Lev Hasharon youth team and helped them to win the Israeli Youth State Cup in 2012, alongside his teammate Tamir Blatt. Huber joined Wingate Institute Academy in his late teens.

Professional career
In 2014, Huber started his professional career with Hapoel Kfar Saba.

On July 5, 2015, Huber signed with A.S. Ramat HaSharon of the Israeli National League. In 26 games played for Ramat HaSharon, he averaged 10.7 points, 3.3 rebounds and 5.3 assists per game. Huber led the National League in 3-point percentage with 47 percent.

On July 26, 2016, Huber signed a two-year deal with Hapoel Jerusalem.  Two days later, He was loaned to Hapoel Holon for the 2016–17 season. Huber helped Holon reach the 2017 Israeli League Playoffs as the first seed, but they eventually were eliminated by Maccabi Haifa.

On July 27, 2017, Huber joined Maccabi Haifa for the 2017–18 season.

On June 27, 2018, Huber returned to Hapoel Holon for a second stint, signing a three-year deal.

On July 27, 2019, Huber signed a one-year deal with Hapoel Galil Elyon of the Israeli National League.

On July 30, 2020, he signed with Hapoel Eilat of the Israeli Premier League.

On May 28, 2022, he has signed with Hapoel Galil Elyon of the Israeli Premier League.

Israel national team
Huber was a member of the U-16, U-18 and U-20 Israel national teams.

In July 2017, Huber helped the Israeli under-20 national team to reach the 2017 FIBA Europe Under-20 Championship Finals, where they eventually lost to Greece. Huber finished the tournament averaging 8.9 points, 2.9 rebounds and 2.1 assists.

Personal
Huber's older brother, Ophir, is also a professional basketball player.

References

External links 
 RealGM profile
 FIBA profile

1997 births
Living people
Hapoel Eilat basketball players
Hapoel Galil Elyon players
Hapoel Holon players
Hapoel Kfar Saba B.C. players
Israeli men's basketball players
Maccabi Haifa B.C. players
Point guards
Shooting guards